Information Retrieved is the fifth full-length studio album by the San Diego indie rock band Pinback, released on October 16, 2012 through Temporary Residence Ltd.

Background
On August 15, 2012 the album's first single "Proceed to Memory" was made available for streaming on Rolling Stone. The album's second single, "His Phase", was made available for streaming on Pitchfork on September 20, 2012. Eventually, the entire album was made available for streaming for limited time on Soundcheck.

On October 16, 2012 Information Retrieved and the music video for the album track "Sherman" were simultaneously released. The video was directed by Matt Hoyt and was inspired by the 1962 sci-fi film Planeta Bur.

Track listing

Personnel
Information Retrieved album personnel adapted from Allmusic.

Primary musicians (Pinback)
 Rob Crow - Art Conception, Collage, Drum Programming, Drums, Guitar, Keyboards, Mixing, Engineer, Vocals, Composer
 Zach Smith - Bass, Drum Programming, Guitar, Keyboards, Mixing, Engineer, Percussion, Vocals, Composer
Additional musicians 
 Anton Patzner - Violin
 Lewis Patzner - Cello
 Chris Prescott - Drums
Production
 Ben Moore - Remixing
 Roger Seibel - Mastering
Album artwork
 Daniel Danger - Illustrations
 Jeremy DeVine - Layout
 Matt Hoyt - Photography

Charts

References

External links
 Official website 
 Official Facebook

2012 albums
Pinback albums
Temporary Residence Limited albums